Hindsiclava caroniana is an extinct species of sea snail, a marine gastropod mollusc in the family Pseudomelatomidae, the turrids and allies.

Distribution
Fossils of this marine species were found in Pliocene strata of Venezuela and in Miocene strata of Trinidad and Tobago; age range: 11.608 to 2.588 Ma

References

 Maury, Carlotta Joaquina. "A further contribution to the paleontology of Trinidad (Miocene horizons)." Bulletin of American Paleontology 10.42 (1925): 153–410.
 B. Landau and C. Marques da Silva. 2010. Early Pliocene gastropods of Cubagua, Venezuela: Taxonomy, palaeobiogeography and ecostratigraphy. Palaeontos 19:1-221

External links
 Fossilworks: † Hindsiclava caroniana

caroniana
Gastropods described in 1925